Taylors is a census-designated place (CDP) in Greenville County, South Carolina, United States. The population was 21,617 at the 2010 census. Taylors is the Greenville/Spartanburg area's largest suburb although it is not incorporated as a city. It is part of the Greenville–Mauldin–Easley Metropolitan Statistical Area. The area serves as the result of urban sprawl in the Greenville metropolitan city.

History
The Southern Bleachery and Print Works in the Taylors Mill was listed on the National Register of Historic Places in 2012.

Geography
Taylors is located at  (34.913236, -82.310817).  The Enoree River flows through the community, and during the late nineteenth and early twentieth centuries, Chick Springs served as the focus of a small Upstate South Carolina resort community.

Demographics

2020 census

As of the 2020 United States census, there were 23,222 people, 8,460 households, and 5,844 families residing in the CDP.

2010 census
As of the census of 2010, there were 21,617 people, 7,978 households, and 5,720 families living in the CDP. The population density was 1,853.7 people per square mile (715.5/km2). There were 8,550 housing units at an average density of 787.5 per square mile (304.0/km2). The racial makeup of the CDP was 81.59% White, 14.19% African American, 0.24% Native American, 1.52% Asian, 0.03% Pacific Islander, 1.11% from other races, and 1.31% from two or more races. Hispanic or Latino of any race were 2.91% of the population.

There were 7,978 households, out of which 34.3% had children under the age of 18 living with them, 56.4% were married couples living together, 12.5% had a female householder with no husband present, and 28.3% were non-families. 23.4% of all households were made up of individuals, and 6.2% had someone living alone who was 65 years of age or older. The average household size was 2.52 and the average family size was 2.98.

In the CDP, the population was spread out, with 25.7% under the age of 18, 8.4% from 18 to 24, 31.5% from 25 to 44, 24.0% from 45 to 64, and 10.4% who were 65 years of age or older. The median age was 36 years. For every 100 females, there were 93.8 males. For every 100 females age 18 and over, there were 89.4 males.

The median income for a household in the CDP was $46,986, and the median income for a family was $55,241. Males had a median income of $39,458 versus $28,057 for females. The per capita income for the CDP was $21,463. About 6.8% of families and 8.0% of the population were below the poverty line, including 11.2% of those under age 18 and 6.6% of those age 65 or over.

Economy
Taylors is the global headquarters for Fatz, a fast casual Southern food restaurant with 43 locations.

The Foundations Baptist Fellowship International, an affiliation of Independent Baptist individuals (not churches), is also based in Taylors.

Education
Taylors has a public library, a branch of the Greenville County Library System.
Taylors, South Carolina is home to Eastside High School (EHS).  Nicknamed "The Eagles" EHS won 15 state wrestling championships between 2000 and 2020 (2002, '02, '04, '05, '06, '07, '08, '09, '13, '14, '16, '17, '18, '19, and 2020).  During this run, Coach Jack Kosmicki led the Eagles to six successive state championships on two occasions, a feat unprecedented in South Carolina High School athletics.

References

Census-designated places in Greenville County, South Carolina
Census-designated places in South Carolina
Upstate South Carolina